Blayney Townley may refer to:
 Blayney Townley (Dunleer MP), MP (1692–1715) for Dunleer (Parliament of Ireland constituency) 
 Blayney Townley-Balfour (Carlingford MP)  (1705–1788), born Blayney Townley